The Satellite Award for Best Classic DVD was an award given by the International Press Academy from 2004 to 2010 and in 2012.

Winners and nominees

References

Classic DVD
2004 establishments
2012 disestablishments